Tinea dubiella is a species of moth belonging to the family Tineidae.

It is native to Europe. This species has been recorded in New Zealand and is regarded as being established in that country.

Description
Head with rust red hair.Forewing dark grey-brown with weak black spots, usually at least two and  a hyaline spot near the base.Hindwings light grey. Difficult to distinguish from Tinea columbariella, Tinea pellionella and Tinea svenssoni but the genitalia are diagnostic.

Biology
The moth flies at night from July-August. It is found indoors including in barns and stables. The larva is whitish with a reddish-brown head and feeds on wool, hides, furs, feathers,  insect collections, etc.

References

Gaedike,R. 2019  Tineidae II : Myrmecozelinae, Perissomasticinae, Tineinae, Hieroxestinae, Teichobiinae and Stathmopolitinae Microlepidoptera of Europe, vol. 9. Leiden : Brill, [2019] 
Petersen, G., 1957: Die Genitalien der paläarktischen Tineiden (Lepidoptera: Tineidae). Beiträge zur Entomologie 7 (1/2): 55–176.

External links
Lepiforum de

Tineinae
Moths of Europe
Moths of New Zealand
Moths described in 1859